This is a list of companies founded by University of California, Berkeley alumni, including attendees who enrolled in degree-programs at Berkeley but did not graduate. This list is not exhaustive, as it only includes notable companies  of which the founding and development history is well recorded by reliable sources. In particular, subsidiaries are listed with their owners in parentheses.

UC Berkeley has often been cited as one of the leading universities worldwide in producing entrepreneurs and attracting funding for start-up companies. Its alumni and faculty have founded a large number of companies, and its degrees are among the most valuable in Silicon Valley. 

According to PitchBook, from 2006 to 2017, Berkeley produced 1,089 company founders as alumni or current students, second only to Stanford University in the world; and these founders created 961 companies, more than any other university in the world.

In this list, founders of a company which merged with other companies to form a new company are counted as founders of the new company. However, founders of a company which later dissolved into several successor companies are not counted as founders of those successor companies; this same rule applies to spin-off companies. Finally, a defunct company is a company that had stopped functioning completely (e.g., bankrupt) without dissolving, merging or being acquired.

Top companies by revenues

Fortune Global 500 (2017) 
This list shows companies in Fortune Global 500 founded or co-founded by UC Berkeley alumni. The cut-off revenue for 2017 Fortune Global 500 companies is $21,609M in 2016.

*: Merger of different companies, at least one of which was founded by UC Berkeley alumni.

Fortune 1000 (2017) 
This list shows companies in Fortune 1000 (only for companies within the U.S.) founded or co-founded by UC Berkeley alumni. The cut-off revenue for 2017 Fortune 1000 companies is $1,791M in 2016.

*: Merger of different companies, at least one of which was founded by Berkeley alumni.

Former Fortune-listed companies 
For each company, only the latest rankings (up to three years) are shown in this list.

*: Merger of different companies, at least one of which was founded by Berkeley alumni.

Timeline

Index 
This index also contains companies listed in section "Notable defunct & dissolved".

Year 2000–present

Year 1980–1999

Year 1960–1979

Before 1960

Notable defunct & dissolved

See also 
 List of companies founded by Harvard University alumni
 List of companies founded by MIT alumni
 List of companies founded by Stanford University alumni
 List of companies founded by University of Pennsylvania alumni
 List of University of California, Berkeley alumni in business and entrepreneurship
 List of University of California, Berkeley alumni

References 

University of California, Berkeley
UC Berkeley alumni